Piney Run is a tributary of the Potomac River in Loudoun County, Virginia.  The creek is the principal drainage of the upper Between the Hills valley in northwestern Loudoun County.

Just prior to an impoundment,  from its headwaters on the property of the Blue Ridge Center for Environmental Stewardship, the creek is joined by its only named tributary branch, Sweet Run. From the impoundment, the creek flows , to the crossing by State Route 671, whereupon the creek cuts a deep gorge, falling  over its last .

See also
List of rivers of Virginia

References
Loudoun Watershed Watch

Rivers of Loudoun County, Virginia
Rivers of Virginia
Tributaries of the Potomac River